Roderick "Rod" Robinson (born May 17, 1976) is a former American football quarterback who played two seasons for the Las Vegas Gladiators of the Arena Football League, as well as a season in NFL Europe for the Barcelona Dragons and a season in the af2 for the Memphis Xplorers. He also spent 3 years on the practice squads of the Indianapolis Colts, Philadelphia Eagles and Jacksonville Jaguars.

Professional career

Indianapolis Colts
Robinson went undrafted in the 1999 NFL Draft, and signed as an undrafted free agent with the Indianapolis Colts on April 21, 1999. He competed with Kelly Holcomb, Stoney Case and Jim Kubiak for the backup quarterback position to Peyton Manning, but failed to make the team's roster.

Philadelphia Eagles
On September 14, 1999, Robinson was signed to the Philadelphia Eagles' practice squad. He was released on October 19, 1999.

Jacksonville Jaguars
Robinson signed with the Jacksonville Jaguars during the 2000 offseason, and was a preseason member of the squad. He was released on August 22, 2000.

Barcelona Dragons
Robinson appeared in a few games for the Barcelona Dragons during the 2001 season, throwing for 474 yards with 2 touchdowns and 4 interceptions. He also ran for 49 yards and a touchdown.

Indianapolis Colts
Robinson returned to the Colts in 2001, winning the team's 3rd string quarterback position behind Manning and Mark Rypien. Robinson was released after Week 10 of the regular season on November 21, 2001.

Jacksonville Jaguars
On November 22, 2001, just days after his release from Indianapolis, the Jaguars signed Robinson to the practice squad. Robinson finished the season with the Jaguars. He was re-signed by the Jaguars in April, 2002, and was released by the team in August 2002.

Memphis Xplorers
On April 11, 2003, Robinson signed with the Memphis Xplorers of af2.

Las Vegas Gladiators
Robinson signed with the Las Vegas Gladiators for the 2004 season, where he won the backup job to Clint Dolezel. After an entire season as a backup, Robinson started for the Dolezel in Week 2 of the 2005 regular season.

References

External links
Just Sports Stats

Living people
1976 births
American football quarterbacks
Arkansas–Pine Bluff Golden Lions football players
Barcelona Dragons players
Memphis Xplorers players
Las Vegas Gladiators players
Players of American football from Memphis, Tennessee